Biddlestone Chapel is a redundant Roman Catholic chapel in Biddlestone, Northumberland, England. It is recorded in the National Heritage List for England as a designated Grade II* listed building, and it is owned by the Historic Chapels Trust. The lower parts of the structure, a former pele tower, are designated as a Scheduled Monument. The chapel is located on the slopes of the Cheviot Hills in the Northumberland National Park.

History

Biddlestone Chapel was built in or about 1820 for the Roman Catholic Selby family of Biddlestone Hall, the architect probably being John Dobson who designed the now demolished Selby mansion in a severe Greek revival style.  It is constructed on the site of a 13th-century pele tower, which was attached to the hall, and incorporates some of its fabric. Alterations were made to the interior of the chapel in 1862 by William Selby. The Biddlestone estate was sold in 1914, and the chapel became the responsibility of the Diocese of Hexham and Newcastle. During the Second World War the basement was converted into an air raid shelter. The chapel became redundant in 1992, and transferred to the ownership of Historic Chapels Trust in 1996. The Trust carried out a programme of restoration and repair in 2008. The rest of the hall was demolished circa 1960.

Architecture

Exterior
Medieval masonry from the pele tower has been retained in the lower parts of the chapel, clearly seen on the exterior. The rest of the chapel is constructed in random rubble ashlar. It has a Lakeland slate roof. The chapel has three bays. At the east end is an entrance and a three-light window with Y-tracery. There are three more windows on the south side. The west end was formerly attached to the hall. It is irregular and patched, and contains parts of blocked mullioned windows. There is also a doorway leading to a stairway to the upper floor; this was initially external, but has been closed in. On the east gable is a foliated cross finial.

Interior
Inside, the basement is the tunnel vaulted lower part of the tower. At the east end of this is a corrugated iron air raid shelter. Upstairs is the chapel proper, with plastered walls, a timber roof, and Gothic Revival fittings. Originally the walls were decorated with stencilling. There are heraldic crests in stained glass of the Selby family. The walls at the east end are inscribed with quotations from the Psalms. Flanking the altar are statues of Mary and Joseph. The Stations of the Cross are represented by photographs. The stained glass in the east window is attributed to William Wailes, and depicts the Crucifixion.

See also
 List of chapels preserved by the Historic Chapels Trust

References

Grade II* listed churches in Northumberland
Scheduled monuments in Northumberland
History of Northumberland
19th-century Roman Catholic church buildings in the United Kingdom
Churches preserved by the Historic Chapels Trust
Roman Catholic churches in Northumberland
Grade II* listed Roman Catholic churches in England
Roman Catholic chapels in England